Auguste Charpentier (1813–1880) was a French painter. He attained fame under the Second French Empire as a portraitist for numerous celebrities of the time such as George Sand, Mademoiselle Rachel, Narcisse Diaz de la Pena, Alexandre Dumas, and Marie Delaporte.

Partial list of works

 Musée des beaux-arts de Caen : Pâtre italien (lost work), oil on canvas
 Musée des beaux-arts de Caen : Courtisane, oil on canvas
 Musée des beaux-arts de Dole : Portrait de Joseph Lyard, oil on canvas
 Grand'Combe-Châteleu, Saint-Joseph Church : Sainte-Madeleine, oil on canvas 
 Paris, Saint-Roch Church, ten paintings classified as historical monuments: 
 Les Funérailles, 1833, oil on canvas
 La Résurrection, oil on canvas 
 Les Saintes Femmes au sépulcre, oil on canvas
 La Loi divine, oil on canvas 
 L'Innocence, oil on canvas
 L'Extrême-onction, oil on canvas
 La Force, oil on canvas
 La Sagesse, oil on canvas
 La Charité, oil on canvas
 La Religion, oil on canvas
 Paris, musée de la vie romantique : Portrait de George Sand, 1838,  George Sand et ses amis à Nohan
 Musée des beaux-arts de Rouen : Portrait de Bocage, artiste dramatique, before 1862,
 Musée de Vendôme : Portrait de Charles Mansui
 Musée national des châteaux de Versailles et de Trianon : Narcisse Diaz de la Pena (1808–1878), 1849, oil on canvas
 Musée des beaux-arts de Bernay, Portrait de Pierre-Victorien Lottin de Laval, oil on canvas

References

Further reading
 Gérald Schurr, Les Petits Maîtres de la peinture 1820–1920'', tome 4, Paris, Éditions de l'Amateur, 1979, pp. 20–25.

19th-century French painters
French male painters
1813 births
1880 deaths
19th-century French male artists